Milton Jimmy Hickey Jr. (born November 5, 1966) is an American businessman in  construction and property management as well as a state senator in Arkansas. He serves in the Arkansas Senate. He has served in the state senate since 2013. He lives in Texarkana. He worked as a banker. 

Hickey served as Senate president pro tempore during the 93rd Arkansas General Assembly. He is a Republican.

References

1966 births
Living people
Republican Party Arkansas state senators